Evangelismos is a settlement of the former municipal unit of Makrychori, which belongs to the municipality of Tempi in the Larissa regional unit, Thessaly, Greece. Evangelismos had 127 inhabitants at the 2011 census.

Evangelismos is built at an altitude of 50 meters NE of the regional capital, Larissa, in close proximity to the Vale of Tempe and the mountain range of Ossa. Until 1997, it was the seat of the homonymous community of the province of Larissa, while then it was part of the Kapodistrian municipality of Makrychori. In 2011 it came under the Kallikrat municipality of Tempi.

At the beginning of 2016 at S.E.A. of the area temporarily accommodated refugees passing through from the Middle East.

On 28 February 2023, at 23:21 EET, the area near the settlement was the scene of a head-on collision between an InterCity service and an intermodal train going in the opposite direction on the same stretch of track. With ≥57 dead, ≥85 injured and 2 unaccounted for, it is the single worst railway disaster in the history of railways in Greece.

Population censuses

References

Ευαγγελισμός Λάρισας

External links
Ευαγγελισμός Λάρισας on wikimapia

Populated places in Larissa (regional unit)